Ma Xiaoguang (born 1955) is a Chinese diplomat who is the current director of the Information Bureau of the Taiwan Affairs Office of the State Council, in office since January 2014.

Biography
Ma was born in Kailu County, Inner Mongolia, in 1955. His father was an editor of a TV station, and his mother was a teacher of a primary school of Hui people. In 1970, his parents were sent to the May Seventh Cadre Schools to do farm works in Yongji County (now Yongji), Shanxi, where he was educated. In 1980, he was admitted to Peking University with the first place of students of arts in Shanxi province. After graduating in 1987, he joined the faculty of the Renmin University of China, where he taught the history of literary criticism in ancient China.

Ma was transferred to the Association for Relations Across the Taiwan Straits in 1992.

In November 2013, he was promoted to director of the Information Bureau of the Taiwan Affairs Office of the State Council, concurrently holding the spokesperson position.

References

1955 births
Living people
People from Kailu County
Peking University alumni
Academic staff of Renmin University of China
Chinese diplomats
People's Republic of China politicians from Inner Mongolia
Chinese Communist Party politicians from Inner Mongolia